Amnicolidae is a family of small freshwater snails with a gill and an operculum, aquatic gastropod mollusks in the superfamily Rissooidea.

This family is in the clade Littorinimorpha (according to the taxonomy of the Gastropoda by Bouchet & Rocroi, 2005). This family was previously considered to be a subfamily of Hydrobiidae.

Subfamilies 
The family Amnicolidae consists of 3 subfamilies (according to the taxonomy of the Gastropoda by Bouchet & Rocroi, 2005):
Subfamily Amnicolinae Tryon, 1863, synonymised with:
Tribe Erhaiini Davis & Kuo, 1985
Subfamily Lyogyrinae Pilsbry, 1916
Subfamily Parabythinellinae Radoman, 1976
Tribe Pseudobythinellini Davis & Chen, 1992
Subfamily Baicaliinae P. Fisher, 1885, synonymised with:
Subfamily Liobaicaliinae B. Dybowski & Grochmalicki, 1913
Subfamily Turribaicaliinae B. Dybowski & Grochmalicki, 1917

Genera
Subfamily Amnicolinae Tryon, 1863
Akiyoshia Kuroda & Habe, 1954, synonymised with:
Akiyoshia (Saganoa) Kuroda, Habe & Tamu, 1958
Amnicola Gould & Haldeman, 1840, synonymised with:
Amnicola (Amnicola) Gould & Haldeman, 1840
Hydrobia (Amnicola) Gould & Haldeman, 1840
Chencuia Davis, 1997
Colligyrus Hershler, 1999
Dasyscias F. G. Thompson & Hershler, 1991
Erhaia Davis & Kuo, 1985, synonymised with:
Pseudobythinella Liu & Zhang, 1979
Kolhymamnicola Starobogatov & Budnikova, 1976
Lyogyrus Gill, 1863
Marstoniopsis van Regteren Altena, 1936
Moria Kuroda & Habe, 1958
Rachipteron F.G. Thompson, 1964
Subfamily Baicaliinae P. Fisher, 1885
Baicalia Martens, 1876, synonymised with:
Baicalia (Baicalia) Martens, 1876
Baicalia (Trachybaicalia) Martens, 1876
Baikalia Dall, 1877
Baikalia (Trachybaikalia) G. Nevill, 1885
Limnorea W. Dybowski, 1875
Limnorea (Ligea) W. Dybowski, 1875
Trachybaikalia G. Nevill, 1885
Turribaicalia B. Dybowski & Grochmalicki, 1917
Dybowskia Dall, 1877
Godlewskia Crosse & P. Fischer, 1879
Korotnewia Kozhov, 1936
Liobaicalia Martens, 1876, synonymised with:
Baicalia (Liobaicalia) Martens, 1876
Hydrobia (Liobaikalia) Dall, 1877
Limnorea (Leucosia) W. Dybowski, 1875
Maackia Clessin, 1880, synoynmised with:
Baicalia (Maackia) Clessin, 1880
Maackia (Eubaicalia) Lindholm, 1924
Maackia (Maackia) Clessin, 1880
Parabaikalia Lindholm, 1909
Pseudobaikalia Lindholm, 1909, synonymised with:
Pseudobaicalia B. Dybowski, 1911
Pseudobaikalia (Microbaicalia) Kozhov, 1936
Pseudobaikalia (Pseudobaikalia) Lindholm, 1909
Pyrgobaicalia Starobogatov, 1972
Teratobaikalia Lindholm, 1909, synonymised with:
Teratobaikalia (Baikaliella) Lindholm, 1909
Teratobaikalia (Teratobaikalia) Lindholm, 1909
Teratobaikalia (Trichiobaikalia) Lindholm, 1909

References